Shahidullah (born 6 February 1999) is an Afghan cricketer. He made his List A debut for Afghanistan A against Zimbabwe A during their tour to Zimbabwe on 27 January 2017. Prior to his List A debut, he was named in Afghanistan's squad for the 2014 Under-19 Cricket World Cup. He made his international debut for the Afghanistan cricket team in March 2021.

Career
Shahidullah made his Twenty20 debut for Band-e-Amir Dragons in the 2017 Shpageeza Cricket League on 12 September 2017. He made his first-class debut for Mis Ainak Region in the 2017–18 Ahmad Shah Abdali 4-day Tournament on 19 November 2017. He was the leading run-scorer for Mis Ainak Region in the 2018 Ahmad Shah Abdali 4-day Tournament, with 663 runs in eight matches.

In September 2018, Shahidullah was named in Kabul's squad in the first edition of the Afghanistan Premier League tournament. In December 2018, he was named in Afghanistan's under-23 team for the 2018 ACC Emerging Teams Asia Cup.

In August 2019, Shahidullah was named in Afghanistan's Twenty20 International (T20I) squad for the 2019–20 Bangladesh Tri-Nation Series. In November 2019, he was named in Afghanistan's squad for the 2019 ACC Emerging Teams Asia Cup in Bangladesh. In February 2021, he was named in Afghanistan's Test squad for their series against Zimbabwe. He made his Test debut for Afghanistan, against Zimbabwe, on 10 March 2021.

In July 2021, Shahidullah was named in Afghanistan's One Day International (ODI) squad for their series against Pakistan. In January 2022, he was named in Afghanistan's ODI squad for their series against the Netherlands in Qatar. He made his ODI debut on 21 January 2022, for Afghanistan against the Netherlands.

References

External links
 

1999 births
Living people
Afghan cricketers
Afghanistan Test cricketers
Afghanistan One Day International cricketers
Sportspeople from Khost
Mis Ainak Knights cricketers
Spin Ghar Tigers cricketers
Kabul Zwanan cricketers